Fred Hume (1898-1978) was an Australian professional rugby league footballer who played in the 1920s. He played for Eastern Suburbs and St. George in the New South Wales Rugby League (NSWRL) competition.

Career
A centre, Hume played 18 matches for Eastern Suburbs club in the years (1920–22) before joining the St. George club the following season.
Hume played for St George between 1923 and 1926.

In 1921 Hume represented New South Wales in an interstate match against Queensland.

References

 The Encyclopedia Of Rugby League Players; Alan Whiticker & Clen Hudson

1898 births
1978 deaths
Australian rugby league players
New South Wales rugby league team players
Rugby league centres
Rugby league fullbacks
St. George Dragons players
Sydney Roosters players